Pseudodaphnella ramsayi is a species of sea snail, a marine gastropod mollusk in the family Raphitomidae.

Description
The white shell is oblong ovate, somewhat acuminated, longitudinally closely ribbed, corded with fine transverse ridges. The interstices are deep. The shell contains six flat whorls, encircled at the suture with black, showing plainer on the back of the body whorl. The brown apex is acute. The outer lip is thickened. The sinus is narrow. The siphonal canal is a little recurved.

A peculiar wide basal furrow groups Pseudodaphnella ramsayi with such species as Philbertia alba Deshayes, 1863, Paramontana blanfordi (Nevill & Nevill, 1875), Kermia cavernosa (Reeve, 1843) Pseudodaphnella leuckarti (Dunker, 1860), Paramontana mayana Hedley, 1922  Pseudodaphnella oligoina Hedley, 1922, Kermia spelaeodea Hervier, 1897, Pseudodaphnella stipata Hedley, 1922 and Pseudodaphnella tincta Reeve, 1846.

Distribution
This marine species occurs off New Guinea and circum Australia.

References

External links
  Tucker, J.K. 2004 Catalog of recent and fossil turrids (Mollusca: Gastropoda). Zootaxa 682:1–1295
 Kilburn, R. N. (2009). Genus Kermia (Mollusca: Gastropoda: Conoidea: Conidae: Raphitominae) in South African Waters, with Observations on the Identities of Related Extralimital Species. African Invertebrates. 50(2): 217–236

ramsayi
Gastropods described in 1876